The Hyde Park–Kenwood National Bank Building was built in 1928–29 at 1525 East 53rd Street, Chicago, Illinois, as the headquarters and sole business location of the Hyde Park–Kenwood National Bank, a community bank that served the Chicago neighborhood of Hyde Park.  When opened for business in April 1929, this 10-story structure was the largest bank building in Chicago outside of the Chicago Loop. The building was designed by K.M. Vitzthum & Co. in the Classical Revival style, with some Art Deco ornamentation; it is faced with Bedford stone. The facade and the second floor main banking hall were renovated by Florian Architects under the design direction of Paul Florian in 2005. The building is now a Chicago Landmark.

The Hyde Park–Kenwood National Bank, controlled by banker-developer John A. Carroll, was meant to be a pillar of its Chicago neighborhood.  Like other bank buildings constructed before the Great Depression, the Hyde Park Bank Building was built to serve as a multi-purpose facility, with the building's 53rd Street frontage rented out to retail stores, the bank's public space occupying the interior of the first floor and all of the second floor, back-office facilities occupying more space, and additional office space set aside for rental by independent professionals such as physicians and lawyers.  A thriving nearby electric railway station made this a prime location for capital-intensive development.

Constructed for $2 million, this bank building opened only six months before the Crash of 1929, which permanently affected the U.S. banking business.  As a result of the Great Depression, the building's flagship institution, Hyde Park–Kenwood National Bank, closed permanently in June 1932; depositors were eventually paid off in full, but had to wait until World War II for the final payout.  However, another chartered bank then occupied the unused financial space, and the 1929 structure continued in use for banking purposes as of 2012.

The bank building is built on the historic location of the town hall of the former Hyde Park Township, the municipal government of independent Hyde Park prior to annexation by the city of Chicago in 1889.

References

External link
 Hyde Park Bank, current flagship occupant of building

Art Deco architecture in Illinois
Banks based in Chicago
Commercial buildings completed in 1929
Office buildings in Chicago
Chicago Landmarks